Emil Bijlsma (born 6 September 1998) is a Dutch professional footballer who plays for VV Hoogeveen, as a midfielder.

Career
After playing for FC Emmen he signed for VV Hoogeveen in August 2019.

References

1998 births
Living people
Dutch footballers
FC Emmen players
Vv Hoogeveen players
Eerste Divisie players
Association football midfielders
People from Borger-Odoorn
Footballers from Drenthe